Heartland is the fourth album by Celtic rock band Runrig. It was released in 1985, and was their first output in which English songs exceeded the number of Gaelic ones.

Track listing

 "O Cho Meallt" (Much Deception) - 3:04
 "This Darkest Winter" - 4:29
 "Lifeline" - 4:09
 "Air a' Chuan" (On the Ocean) - 5:09
 "Dance Called America" - 4:33
 "The Everlasting Gun" - 4:26
 "Skye" - 3:31
 "Cnoc na Fèille" (The Hill at the Marketplace) - 4:40
 "The Wire" - 5:28
 "An Ataireachd Àrd" (The High Swell) - 4:30
 "The Ferry"  - 4:12
 "Tuireadh Iain Ruaidh" (Lament for Red John) - 2:42

Personnel
Runrig
Iain Bayne - drums, percussion
Richard Cherns - keyboards
Malcolm Jones - guitars, mandolin, bass guitar, Vocals
Calum Macdonald - percussion
Rory Macdonald - vocals, bass guitar, accordion, twelve-string guitar
Donnie Munro - lead vocals
Guest artists
Mairi MacInnes - Gaelic vocal
Chris Harley - keyboards, harmonies
Les Lavin - keyboards

External links
 Runrig's official website

1985 albums
Scottish Gaelic music
Runrig albums